Gallagher v Post Office [1970] 3 All ER 712 is a UK labour law case, concerning the enforceability of collective agreements.

Facts
Mr Gallagher was a member of the National Guild of Telephonists that the Post Office wish to derecognise in the process of changing into a public company under the Post Office Act 1969. It wished solely to recognise the Union of Postal Workers. Mr Gallagher claimed this would breach an implied term of his contract, based on what a trainer had told him when he started, namely that he was free to join any or no union.

Judgment
Brightman J held that it could not be an express term of the contract, and the statement by the trainer was merely an informative statement. It could not be actionable as a term that someone was covered by any particular agreement.

See also
UK labour law

Notes

References

United Kingdom labour case law
1970 in British law
1970 in case law
High Court of Justice cases